is a Japanese speed skater. She competed at the 1992 Winter Olympics and the 1998 Winter Olympics.

References

1971 births
Living people
Japanese female speed skaters
Olympic speed skaters of Japan
Speed skaters at the 1992 Winter Olympics
Speed skaters at the 1998 Winter Olympics
Sportspeople from Nagano Prefecture
World Allround Speed Skating Championships medalists
Universiade silver medalists for Japan
Universiade medalists in speed skating
Competitors at the 1991 Winter Universiade
20th-century Japanese women
21st-century Japanese women